Holt End is a hamlet in the large civil parish of Bentworth in Hampshire, England, between Bentworth and Medstead.

The word Holt means a small grove of trees, copse, or wood, and Holt End means the end of a wood.

The nearest railway station is Alton which is 4 miles (6 km) to the east.  Until 1932 it was the Bentworth and Lasham railway station on the Basingstoke and Alton Light Railway, until its closure.

References

Villages in Hampshire